Carpenter is an unincorporated community in Clark County, South Dakota, United States. It is not tracked by the Census Bureau. Carpenter has the post office serving the ZIP code 57322 area. Despite the city's size of one square city block, businesses such as Agtegra, the Carpenter Cafe, Dick's Garage, and the post office flourish here.

History

Carpenter was named by postmaster John C. Opsahl for his recently deceased friend, G. W. Carpenter, a land office agent in nearby Watertown, Codington County.

References

Unincorporated communities in Clark County, South Dakota
Unincorporated communities in South Dakota